An election for President of Israel was held in the Knesset on 21 May 1963 following the death of the county's second president, Yitzhak Ben-Zvi on 23 April. Between Ben-Zvi's death and the winner of the election, Zalman Shazar, taking office on the day of the vote, Knesset speaker Kadish Luz served as acting president.

Candidates 
There were two candidates:
 Zalman Shazar: A member of the Knesset for Mapai, and former Minister of Education and editor of the Davar newspaper.
 Peretz Bernstein: A member of the Knesset for the Liberal Party, former Minister of Trade and Industry and a signatory of the Israeli declaration of independence.

Results
The election was settled in the first round, with Shazar gaining an outright majority of votes in the 120-seat Knesset.

External links
Presidential elections Knesset website 

President
Presidential elections in Israel
Israel